Elaterite (also known as Aeonite, 'elastic bitumen' , 'mineral caoutchouc' or Wurtzilite) is a brown hydrocarbon varying somewhat in consistency, being sometimes soft, elastic and sticky, like India rubber, and occasionally hard and brittle. It is usually dark brown in color and slightly translucent. A substance of similar physical character is found at sites around the Coorong lagoon in South Australia, and is hence termed coorongite.

Occurrence in nature

 Strawberry, Utah, USA: Elaterite can be found in the Indian Canyon, Sams Canyon, Dry Fork, and Lake canyon, as well as in tributaries of the Strawberry river in Duchesne County. It occurs in vertical veins from one to twenty-two inches wide, twenty to two hundred feet high, and a maximum length of three and one quarter miles"  Elaterite also flows from the ground in a soft elastic form at various locations along the Strawberry River

 Castleton in Derbyshire: Elaterite can be found beside the Windy Knoll Cave and the lead mines of Odin.

References

Attribution

Further reading

Hydrocarbons
Organic minerals